Bolasterone (brand names Myagen, Methosarb; former developmental code name U-19763), also known as 7α,17α-dimethyltestosterone, is a 17α-alkylated androgen/anabolic steroid (AAS) which is used in veterinary medicine. It has close structural similarity to testosterone, and like methyltestosterone has a methyl group at C17α in order to increase oral bioavailability. In addition, it is also 7α-methylated, similar to its 7β-methylated isomer calusterone. The medication has a low to moderate ratio of anabolic to androgenic activity, similar to that of fluoxymesterone.

Bolasterone is on the World Anti-Doping Agency's list of prohibited substances, and is therefore banned from use in most major sports.

References

Androgens and anabolic steroids
Androstanes
Hepatotoxins
World Anti-Doping Agency prohibited substances